Orocrambus corruptus is a moth in the family Crambidae. It was described by Arthur Gardiner Butler in 1877. It is endemic to New Zealand. It is known from the lowland and intermontane region areas of eastern and central South Island. The habitat consists of poorly drained areas up to 750 meters and old pastures.

The wingspan is 15–20 mm. Adults have been recorded on wing from September to early December and again in February in some areas.

The larvae have been reared on Funaria species, Poa annua, Bromus dactylis and Trifolium repens.

References

Crambinae
Moths of New Zealand
Moths described in 1877
Endemic fauna of New Zealand
Taxa named by Arthur Gardiner Butler
Endemic moths of New Zealand